Schneidereria platyphracta is a moth of the family Gelechiidae. It is found in southern India.

References

Moths described in 1935
Litini